Stuart MacIver (born 12 November 1966) was a Scottish footballer who played for Dumbarton and Clyde.

References

1966 births
Scottish footballers
Dumbarton F.C. players
Clyde F.C. players
Scottish Football League players
Living people
Footballers from Glasgow
Association football forwards